André Brincourt (8 November 1920, Neuilly-sur-Seine then Seine (department) – 22 March 2016 aged 95) was a French writer and journalist.

Biography 
A former resistant, volunteer at eighteen during the Second World War (prisoner then escaped, he engaged in the Combat movement of the region of Nice,) André Brincourt directed the cultural pages, then the literary supplement of the newspaper Le Figaro. He was also a literary journalist on television and had television interviews with André Malraux, of which he was a friend.

Alongside his work as a journalist, he wrote about twenty books in a wide variety of literary genres, ranging from poetry to novel. In his last years, he seemed to have a preference for the fragment and the aphorism as evidenced by his latest publications.

A member of the prix Renaudot from 1984 to 2011, following his resignation he was awarded the Grand prix de littérature de l'Académie française in 1999 for all his work.

Works 
1946: Satan et la Poésie, essay, Grasset
1948: Désarroi de l'écriture, essay, Vigneau
1950: Le Vert Paradis, novel, La Table Ronde – prix du Jeune Roman
1952: La Farandole, novel, La Table Ronde – prix Henri-Dumarest 1953 of the Académie française.
1956: Les Œuvres et les Lumières, essay, La Table Ronde – prix Sainte-Beuve
1957: Les Yeux clos, novel, La Table Ronde
1959: La Télévision et ses promesses, essay, La Table Ronde
1965: La Télévision, notes et maximes, Hachette
1965: Malraux ou le temps du silence, essay, La Table Ronde
1973: Noir sur blanc, essai, Fayard
1979: Le Musée imaginaire de la littérature du XXe, Éditions Retz
1986: Malraux, le malentendu, essay, Grasset – prix Georges-Dupau 1987 of the Académie française.
1988: Les Yeux clos, noel, Grasset
1990: La Parole dérobée, noel, Grasset
1995: Messagers de la nuit  : Roger Martin du Gard, Saint-John Perse, André Malraux , essay, Grasset – Prix de la Critique de l'Académie française.
1996: Secrètes Araignées, essay, Grasset
1997: Langue française, terre d'accueil, essay, éditions du Rocher – vermeil medal of the Grand prix de la francophonie.
1999: Vive les mouches, essay, Grasset
2000: Le Bonheur de rompre, novel, Grasset
2001: Le Paradis désenchanté, éditions du Rocher
2003: Tête-de-loup, essay, Grasset
2005: La Mer, l'Amour et la Mort, poetry, Privat
2006 Les Conquérants d'eux-mêmes, essay, Grasset
2007: Insomnies, pensées, Grasset
2009: Vienne le vent, poetry, Melis éditions
2010: Littératures d’outre-tombe, essay, Grasset

Prizes and distinctions 
1945: Croix de guerre 1939-1945 and Médaille de la Résistance.
1956: Prix Sainte-Beuve
1997: Grande médaille de la francophonie
1999: Grand prix de littérature de l'Académie française for all his work

References 

People from Neuilly-sur-Seine
1920 births
20th-century French male writers
20th-century French journalists
20th-century French essayists
21st-century French essayists
French literary critics
Recipients of the Croix de Guerre 1939–1945 (France)
Prix Sainte-Beuve winners
2016 deaths
21st-century French male writers
French male non-fiction writers
Le Figaro people